The 1998 Newcastle City Council election took place on 7 May 1998 to elect members of Newcastle upon Tyne Metropolitan Borough Council in Tyne and Wear, England. One third of the council was up for election and the Labour Party stayed in overall control of the council.

After the election, the composition of the council was:
Labour 65
Liberal Democrat 13

Election result

References

1998 English local elections
1998
20th century in Newcastle upon Tyne